Sofia Lisboa (born 1977) is a Portuguese singer.

She was born in France to Portuguese emigrants, but she come back with her family to Leiria, Portugal, in 1988, where she did secondary school. She also studied at the Faculty of Sciences of the University of Lisbon. She was the backing and supporting vocalist for Silence 4 during their active years, from 1996 to 2001. She provided a sensitive counterpart to David Fonseca's vocals. After the band's demise, she's been involved in other musical projects. After surviving cancer, the band decided to reunite once again for a series of concerts, in 2013 and 2014, where she performed once again with them.

She published her memoir, Nunca Desistas de Viver (2014).

References

1977 births
Living people
21st-century Portuguese women singers
Silence 4 members
French people of Portuguese descent